Pohl is a municipality in the district of Rhein-Lahn, in Rhineland-Palatinate, Germany. It belongs to the association community of Bad Ems-Nassau.

Limeskastell Pohl
Limeskastell Pohl is a reconstructed Roman wood and earth fort and watchtower. The fort is part of the Lower German Limes UNESCO World Heritage Site.

References

External links

 
 
 Limeskastell Pohl (in German)

1240s establishments in the Holy Roman Empire
Municipalities in Rhineland-Palatinate
Populated places established in the 1240s
Rhein-Lahn-Kreis